Pamona (often referred to as Poso, Bare'e, or To Pamona) people inhabits almost the entire Poso Regency, parts of Tojo Una-Una Regency and parts of North Morowali Regency, Central Sulawesi; in fact there are some even in East Luwu Regency of South Sulawesi, whereas a small remainder lives in other parts of Indonesia. The ancestors of the Pamona people originally came from the land of Salu Moge (East Luwu Regency, South Sulawesi) because they were once from the mountains which is far from the central governance thus they were brought down by Macoa Bawalipu of Wotu, East Luwu Regency to be nearer to the central governance, which is the surrounding region of Mangkutana (East Luwu Regency). But it was until a revolt by the Darul Islam (Indonesia) rebellion broke out that they spread to Central Sulawesi and to other regions. If there are Pamona people in certain regions, then it is common that a Rukun Poso (Poso community association) is formed there, which serves as a means of a group of people from a common ethnic background to engage in various activities within the region. Almost all of the Pamona people practices Christianity. Christianity came into the region about 100 years ago and until today it is widely accepted as the religion of the people. Today, all churches of common denomination are grouped under the Central Sulawesi Christian Church headquartered in Tentena, Poso Regency, Central Sulawesi, Indonesia. A large part of the common folk uses Pamona language and Bahasa Indonesia language that is mixed with the local slang. The Pamona people are usually farmers, government officials, pastors, entrepreneurs and so on.

Origins
As a matter of fact, the Pamona people are not identical with the Poso people. This is because in anthropological terms there is no Poso people but only a geographical region called Poso, which is inhabited by the Pamona people. There is also a belief that the word poso came from the word maposo in the local To Pobare'e language which means "break". Whereas according to several notable Poso people, the word poso actually came from the word poso'o that means "fasterner" or "bonds", that gave the name to Poso city with the intention to bind or to unite among the Pamona people that came from the mountains (lake side) and also those that came from the coastal region. While the origin of the name Poso which means "break" is said to have started from the formation of Lake Poso. Apparently Lake Poso was formed from a slab of earth from a hill, where below the slab of earth was a spring of water. Surrounding the mountains are the low lands, until the water flow from the mountains filled around the mountain. The pool of water eroded the earth around the hill until the water penetrate the earth exposing the groundwater. As a result, this caused an abrasion to a volatile soil structure that is somewhat sandy. Slowly the hillside was unable to withstand the weight of the hill above it, causing a landslide that brought the hill down into the wallow of spring below the mountain until a small lake was formed. For the Pamona community, the event of the collapse of the mountain is often mentioned until they coined the word "Lake Poso" which is given as a name to the then newly formed lake. Over time, the lake expanded because of the water source from around the mountain flowed to the new lake. Consequently, the water level of the lake began to rise until the breadth of the lake's surface expended and became wider. (2008As the water begin to continually fill the lake until the lake could no longer contained it, a river was formed and flowed towards the coastal region. As the river came from Lake Poso, therefore it was named with the same name, Poso River. The river mouth of the newly formed river is then occupied by a sizable population, as there is an abundance of fish found in the river. Thus, it is said that the group of the new residents then named the village with the name, "Poso".

There are several ethnics that lived in Poso and they are known as:-
 Pamona people
 Mori people
 Bada or Badar people
 Napu people
 Tojo people
 Kaili people
 Padoe people
 Lore people
 Taa people

Pamona Customary Foundation
The name Pamona also refers to an association of a few ethnics, which is the abbreviation for Pakaroso Mosintuwu Naka Molanto (Pamona). Later Pamona became an ethnic group that were unified under the governance of Dutch colonial. The name Pamona was declared in Tentena, and even a commemoration of the declaration was made by erecting a monument called Watu Mpoga'a as a remembrance of their origin and also naming of a street, Pamona. Historically, the institutionalized of the Pamona customs was previously divided by a few authorities. For Poso, it was led by Datue Poso and a few  of his kabosenya (meaning, elders) that represent each of their own ethnic groups. If in Luwuland, it is led by Makole Tawi and the existence of the institution of Pamona customary currently is divided into two assemblies in Poso, namely Majelis Adat Lemba Pamona Poso, while in Luwuland (East Luwu Regency and North Luwu Regency) is the Lembaga Adat Lemba Pamona Luwu. At the moment, the existence of these assemblies are still preserved by the Pamona community be it those that are in Mangkutana, East Luwu Regency and North Luwu Regency, nor those that are in Poso Regency.

Language

The language that is used by the Pamona people is called Pamona language. The structure of Pamona language is unique in terms of syllables of the root word, where a root word may have different meanings when a prefix, suffix, inserts or affixes are added. An example of a root word that have been changed after a prefix, suffix or affix is added and forms different meanings to it, such as:-

Another example:-

There are also several root words that are classified as inventive words (just like the previous examples which are part of inventive words but are not classified as inventive words) with only a change of the alphabetical positions, thus creating another meaning. For example:-

The Pamona language is unique where there are numerous phase of syllables that can be twisted to form a different meaning, for instance:-

Other examples:-

Art

Music
Traditionally, the Pamona people have a style of music in a form of spoken word poetry. An example of this style of music frequently sung among village folk in the 1940s:-

Dance
Dero or Madero dance is a popular dance among the Pamona people. This dance are usually seen during festivals and normally the dancers are young people. This dance is done in circular motion with hands holding each other while exchanging poems accompanied by joyful music. In a few districts in Palu forbids Dero or Madero dancing activities because it often becomes the cause of scuffles among young boys who seek the attention of young girls. The Dero dance is differentiated by three types of swaying and footwork movements by the rhythm of the music. The first is called ende ntonggola, where two steps are taken to the right, a step backwards and then repeat. This dance is performed during the fullmoon celebration, which indicates the season for preparing the land for farming. The time for farming begins when the fullmoon ends. The following dance movement is called ende ngkoyoe or ende ntoroli, that is two steps to the right and a step to the left. This dance movement is meant during the time of collecting the harvest, during special occasion, or festivals. The final dance movement is called ende ada (customary), which is performed during the celebration of customary holidays or festivals. The dance movements are the same as ende ntoroli, except that the dancers do not hold each other's hands. The Dero dance also forms as a means of courting in public, except for Raego dance which is rather cultural and not associated with courting.

Surnames
Pamona surnames include:-

Awundapu
Banumbu
Bali'e
Baloga
Belala
Betalino
Beto
Botilangi
Bulinde
Bungkundapu
Bungu
Buntinge
Bakumawa
Dike
Dongalemba
Gilirante
Gimbaro
Gugu
Gundo
Kaluti
Kampindo
Kambodji
Kalembiro
Kalengke
Karape
Karebungu
Kayori
Kayupa
Koedio
Kogege
Kolombuto
Kolobinti
Kuko
Lakiu
Langgari
Ladjamba
Lambangasi
Labiro
Liante
Lidongi
Lu'o
Lumaya
Lolongudju
Manganti
Meringgi
Mogadi
Mossepe
Mowose
Monepa
Monipo
Nyolo-nyolo
Nggau
Nggo'u
Nua
Nyaua
Pakuli
Palaburu
Parimo
Pariu
Paroda
Pasunu
Patara
Pebadja
Penina
Pekita
Penyami
Pesudo
Poa
Pombaela
Pobonde
Podala
Polempe
Purasongka
Rangga
Ratengku
Pusuloka
Rampalino
Rampalodji
Rantelangi
Rare'a
Ruagadi
Rubo
Rumbani
Ruutana
Satigi
Sancu'u
Sawiri
Sigilipu
Sipatu
So'e
Sowolino
Tabanci
Tadanugi
Tadalangi
Tadale
Tadadja
Tadjaji
Talasa
Tambo'eo
Tarante
Tasiabe
Tawuku
Tawurisi
Tekora
Tepara
Tiladuru
Tolala
Tobondo
Tobogu
Tolimba
Torau
Toumbo
Tumonggi
Turuka
Ule
Ululai
Warara
Wenali
Werokila nce'i to mori
Wuri
Wutabisu

See also 

 2002 Poso bus attacks
 2005 Indonesian beheadings of Christian girls

References

Further reading 
 

Ethnic groups in Indonesia
Sulawesi